Winnweiler is a Verbandsgemeinde ("collective municipality") in the Donnersbergkreis, in Rhineland-Palatinate, Germany. The seat of the Verbandsgemeinde is in Winnweiler.

The Verbandsgemeinde Winnweiler consists of the following Ortsgemeinden ("local municipalities"):

 Börrstadt 
 Breunigweiler 
 Falkenstein 
 Gonbach 
 Höringen 
 Imsbach 
 Lohnsfeld
 Münchweiler an der Alsenz 
 Schweisweiler 
 Sippersfeld 
 Steinbach am Donnersberg 
 Wartenberg-Rohrbach 
 Winnweiler

Verbandsgemeinde in Rhineland-Palatinate
North Palatinate